Stanislav "Stan" Grof  is a Czech-born psychiatrist who has been living in the United States since the 1960s. Grof is one of the principal developers of transpersonal psychology and research into the use of non-ordinary states of consciousness for purposes of psychological healing, deep self-exploration, and obtaining growth and insights into the human psyche. In 1993, Grof received an Honorary Award from the Association for Transpersonal Psychology (ATP) for major contributions to and development of the field of transpersonal psychology, given at the occasion of the 25th Anniversary Convocation held in Asilomar, California. He also received the VISION 97 award granted by the Foundation of Dagmar and Václav Havel in Prague on October 5, 2007. In 2010, he received the Thomas R. Verny Award from the Association for Pre- and Perinatal Psychology and Health (APPPAH). On the other hand, Grof has been criticized by the skeptic group Český klub skeptiků Sisyfos in the Czech Republic for furthering what they view as nonscientific psychology too far outside the bounds of the materialistic philosophical underpinnings of modern science. He is the only person to have been awarded the anti-prize Erratic Boulder Award twice in that country. Grof was married to psychologist Brigitte Grof in 2014. https://www.brigittegrof.com.

Education and career 
Grof received his M.D. from Charles University in Prague in 1957 and then completed his Ph.D. in medicine at the Czechoslovak Academy of Sciences in 1965, training as a Freudian psychoanalyst at this time. Grof’s early research in the clinical uses of psychedelic substances was conducted at the Psychiatric Research Institute in Prague, where he was principal investigator of a program that systematically explored the heuristic and therapeutic potential of LSD and other psychedelic substances.  

In 1967, he received a scholarship from the Foundations Fund for Research in Psychiatry in New Haven, CT, and was invited by Joel Elkes  to be a Clinical and Research Fellow at Henry Phipps Clinic, a part of Johns Hopkins University School of Medicine in Baltimore, United States. In 1969, he went on to become Chief of Psychiatric Research for the Spring Grove Experiment at the Research Unit of Spring Grove State Hospital (later part of the Maryland Psychiatric Research Center where he worked with Walter Pahnke. In 1969, Grof also became Assistant Professor of Psychiatry at the Johns Hopkins University. In 1973 he was invited to the Esalen Institute in Big Sur, California, and lived there until 1987 as a Scholar-in-Residence, developing his ideas and conducting monthlong workshops. 

Grof was the founding president of the International Transpersonal Association (ITA) (in 1977) and served for several decades as its president. He went on to become distinguished adjunct faculty member of the Department of Philosophy, Cosmology, and Consciousness at the California Institute of Integral Studies, a position he remained in until 2018. In May 2020, he launched, with his wife Brigitte Grof, a new training in working with holotropic states of consciousness, the international Grof® Legacy Training (http://www.grof-legacy-training.com>).

Thought

Psychedelics and breathwork
Grof's early studies were of LSD and its effects on the psyche—the field of psychedelic therapy. Building on his observations while conducting LSD research and on Otto Rank's theory of birth trauma, Grof constructed a theoretical framework for prenatal and perinatal psychology and transpersonal psychology in which experiences in psychedelic sessions and other "holotropic" states are understood as being influenced by biographical material, fetal and perinatal experiences, and a range of transpersonal phenomena. Over time, this theory developed into what Grof called an "expanded cartography of the human psyche." Following the suppression of legal LSD use in the early 1970s, Grof pursued this therapeutic direction without drugs, by codeveloping with his wife Christina Grof, a combination of deep and rapid breathing, evocative music, focused bodywork, and mandala drawing. Originally termed "Holotropic Breathwork," he now uses the term Grof® Breathwork to describe this breathwork technique. Christina Grof died in 2014 and her memorial website is: http://www.christina-grof.com.

Interplay of hylotropic and holotropic impulses in the psyche
Grof distinguishes between two modes of consciousness: the hylotropic and the holotropic. The hylotropic mode relates to "the normal, everyday experience of consensus reality". In contrast, holotropic is characteristic of non-ordinary states of consciousness such as meditative, mystical, or psychedelic experiences. According to Grof, contemporary psychiatry often categorizes these non-ordinary states as pathological. Grof connects the hylotropic to the Buddhist conception of namarupa ("name and form"), the separate, individual, illusory lower self. He connects the holotropic to the Hindu conception of Atman-Brahman.

Hypothesis on near-death experiences

In the late 1970s Grof proposed a psychological hypothesis to explain the near-death experience (NDE). According to Grof the NDE reflects memories of the birth process with the tunnel representing the birth canal. Susan Blackmore claimed the hypothesis is "pitifully inadequate to explain the NDE. For a start the newborn infant would not see anything like a tunnel as it was being born." The psychologist Chris French has written "the experience of being born is only very superficially similar to the NDE" and the hypothesis has been refuted as it is common for those born by caesarean section to experience a tunnel during the NDE. Michael Shermer also criticized the hypothesis "there is no evidence for infantile memories of any kind. Furthermore, the birth canal does not look like a tunnel and besides the infant's head is normally down and its eyes are closed." An article in the peer-reviewed APA journal Psychology of Consciousness suggested that Grof's patients may have experienced false memories of birth and before birth.

Influence on other researchers

 Richard Tarnas Grof's collaboration with Tarnas began in the early 1970s, when Tarnas moved to the Esalen Institute in Big Sur, California, to write his dissertation on psychedelic therapy under the auspices of Grof. They would eventually research a new way of understanding the timing and content of experiences encountered in holotropic states of consciousness, which Tarnas refers to as "archetypal cosmology".

Influences in popular culture

 Grof served as a consultant for special effects in the experiential sequences of the MGM science fiction movie Brainstorm. 
 Served as consultant for special effects in the 20th Century Fox science fiction movie Millennium .
 In 1992, he was a consultant for the BMW Museum “Horizons in Time” in Munich, Germany.
 Grof was featured in the film Entheogen: Awakening the Divine Within, a 2006 documentary about rediscovering an enchanted cosmos in the modern world.
 In 2020, the documentary The Way of the Psychonaut was released, which explores Grof's lifework and contributions to transpersonal psychology.

See also 
 Perinatal matrices
 Breathwork
 Psychedelic therapy

Notes

References

Printed sources

Further reading
 Grof, Stanislav (2019). The Way of the Psychonaut: Encyclopedia for Inner Journeys.
 Howe, ML & Courage, ML (2004). Demystifying the beginnings of memory. Developmental Review, 24(1), 1-5.
 Jacobson, B, Eklund, G, Hamberger, L, Linnarsson, D, Sedvall, G & Valverius, M (1987). Perinatal origin of adult self-destructive behavior. Acta Psychiatrica Scandinavica, 76(4), 364-71.

External links 

 

Czech psychiatrists
Czech psychologists
Transpersonal psychologists
American parapsychologists
Psychedelic drug researchers
American psychedelic drug advocates
American consciousness researchers and theorists
Czechoslovak emigrants to the United States
Johns Hopkins University faculty
University of Maryland, Baltimore faculty
Charles University alumni
Physicians from Prague
Living people
Breathwork practitioners
Year of birth missing (living people)